Hotel Glendale is a historic hotel building in Glendale, California. It was built in the 1920s. It has been listed on the National Register of Historic Places since October 7, 1994.

See also
 Glendale Register of Historic Resources and Historic Districts

References

Hotel buildings on the National Register of Historic Places in California
Beaux-Arts architecture in California
Buildings and structures in Los Angeles County, California
Glendale, California